The ethnic groups in Karachi includes all the ethnic groups in Pakistan. Karachi's inhabitants, locally known as Karachiwala, are composed of ethno-linguistic groups from all parts of Pakistan, as well as migrants from South Asia, making the city's population a diverse melting pot. At the end of the 19th century, the population of the city was about 105,000, with a gradual increase over the next few decades, reaching more than 400,000 on the eve of independence. Estimates of the population range from 15 to 18 million, of which an estimated 90% are migrants from different backgrounds. The city's population is estimated to be growing at about 5% per year (mainly as a result of internal rural-urban migration), including an estimated 45,000 migrant workers coming to the city every month from different parts of Pakistan.

Overview
Karachi is host to many Western expatriates in Pakistan. During the World War II, about 3,000 Polish refugees from Soviet Union evacuated to Karachi, by the British. Some of these Polish families settled permanently in the city. There are also communities of American and British expatriates.

The independence of Pakistan in 1947 saw the settlement of Muslim refugees migrating from India. In Karachi, the Urdu speaking Muslims, now known as Karachiwala form the majority of the population. The Muslim refugees lost all their land and properties in India when they fled and some were partly compensated by properties left by Hindus that migrated to India. The Muslim Kutchi people Gujaratis, Konkani, Hyderabadis, Marathi, Rajasthani, Punjabi fled India and settled in Karachi. There is also a sizable community of Malayali Muslims in Karachi (the Mappila), originally from Kerala in South India. The non-Urdu speaking Muslim refugees from India now speak the  Kutchi Language Urdu language and have assimilated and are considered as Karachiwala.

After the Indo-Pakistani War of 1971, thousands of Biharis and Bengalis from Bangladesh arrived in the city, and today Karachi is home to 1 to 2 million ethnic Bengalis from Bangladesh (see Bangladeshis in Pakistan), many of whom migrated in the 1980s and 1990s. They were followed by Rohingya Muslim refugees from western Burma (for more information, see Burmese people in Pakistan), and Asian refugees from Uganda. One under-privileged sub-ethnic group is the Siddis (Africans – Sheedi) who are now naturalised Sindhi speakers. They are descended from African slaves. Many other refugees from the Central Asian countries constituting the former Soviet Union have also settled in the city as economic migrants. A large numbers of Arabs, Filipinos and an economic elite of Sinhalese from Sri Lanka. Expatriates from China have a history going back to the 1940s; today, many of the Chinese are second-generation children of immigrants who came to the city and worked as dentists, chefs and shoemakers.

The Pashtuns, originally from Khyber Pakhtunkhwa, Afghanistan, the Federally Administered Tribal Areas and northern Balochistan, are now the city's second largest ethnic group after Muhajirs, these Pashtuns are settled in Karachi from decades. With as high as 7 million by some estimates, the city of Karachi in Pakistan has the largest concentration of urban Pakhtun population in the world, including 50,000 registered Afghan refugees in the city, meaning there are more Pashtuns in Karachi than in any other city in the world. As per current demographic ratio Pashtuns are about 25% of Karachi's population. Some 2 Million Pashtuns are stated to be Urdu-speaking/Muhajirs.

Seraikis from southern Punjab have also settled in Karachi in large numbers.

Languages
According to the official census of the country, which was held in 2017, the linguistic distribution of the city was: Urdu: 42.30%; Punjabi: 10.73%; Pashto: 15.01%; Sindhi: 10.67%; Balochi: 4.04%; Saraiki: 4.97%; others: 7.02%. The others include Dari, Gujarati, Dawoodi Bohra, Memon, Marwari, Brahui, Makrani, Khowar, Burushaski, Arabic, Farsi and Bengali.

According to the community leaders and social scientists there are over 1.6 million Bengalis and up to 400,000 Rohingyas living in Karachi. The small ethno-linguistic groups settled in Karachi are being assimilated in the Urdu-speaking community.

According to the census of 1998, the religious breakdown of the city was: Muslim (96.45%); Christian (2.42%); Hindu (0.86%); Ahmadiyya (0.17%); others (0.10%) (Parsis, Sikhs, Baháʼís, Jews and Buddhists).

Muhajirs
Muhajirs are Muslim immigrants of various other ethnic groups and regional origins, and their descendants, who migrated from various regions of India after the Partition of India to settle in the newly independent state of Pakistan. The term Muhajirs refers to those Muslim migrants from India, mainly elites, who mostly settled in urban Sindh. The Muhajir community also includes stranded Pakistanis in Bangladesh who migrated to Pakistan after 1971 following the secession of East Pakistan in the Bangladesh Liberation War.

See also
 Ethnic groups in Pakistan
 Ethnic groups in Sindh
 Demographic history of Karachi
 Demographics of Karachi
 Religion in Karachi
 Demographics of Sindh
 Demographics of Pakistan
 List of metropolitan areas by population

References

Further reading
 The Political Ethnicity and the State of Pakistan

Ethnic groups in Sindh
Karachi